The Ne'er-Do-Well is a 1923 American comedy silent film directed by Alfred E. Green. The film stars Thomas Meighan, Lila Lee, Gertrude Astor, John Miltern, Gus Weinberg, and Sidney Smith. The screenplay by Rex Beach and Louis Stevens is based on Rex Beach's 1911 novel of the same name. The film was released on April 29, 1923, by Paramount Pictures. This film is now considered lost. A previous version of the story was released in 1916.

Plot
Disgusted with his spendthrift son, Kirk Anthony's father has Kirk shanghaied and taken to Panama, where he attracts the attention of Mrs. Edith Cortlandt and falls in love with Chiquita, the daughter of a Panamanian general. He is able to get a railroad job through Edith's husband Stephen Cortlandt and decides to make something of himself when he meets Allen Allan, a Negro soldier of fortune. When the sudden death of Stephen Cortlandt ensues, Kirk is blamed until Edith produces a suicide note and clears his name. He succeeds in his railroad position and returns to the United States with Chiquita and is finally able to earn his father's respect.

Cast
Thomas Meighan as Kirk Anthony
Lila Lee as Chiquita
Gertrude Astor as Edith Cortlandt
John Miltern as Stephen Cortlandt
Gus Weinberg as Andres Garavel
Sidney Smith as Ramón Alfarez 
George O'Brien as Clifford
Jules Cowles as Allen Allan
Larry Wheat as Runnels 
Cyril Ring

See also
Gertrude Astor filmography

References

External links

1923 films
1920s English-language films
Silent American comedy films
1923 comedy films
Paramount Pictures films
Films directed by Alfred E. Green
American black-and-white films
American silent feature films
Lost American films
Films based on works by Rex Beach
Remakes of American films
1923 lost films
Lost comedy films
1920s American films